Aabach may refer to:

Germany 
 Aabach (Afte), a tributary of the Afte, North Rhine-Westphalia
 Aabach (Hessel), a small river in the Ems river system, North Rhine-Westphalia
 Kleine Aa (Aabach) (also the little Aabach), a tributary of the Aabach (Afte), North Rhine-Westphalia

Switzerland
Aabach (Aare) (AG), a creek, which flows into the Aare
Aabach (Greifensee), or Usterner Aa, a river in canton of Zurich
Aabach (Seetal), a river in the cantons of Lucerne and Aargau, runs through Lake Hallwyl and flows into the Aare
Aabach (Obersee), a tributary of the Obersee

See also
 AA (disambiguation)